The 2016–17 season of the Hoofdklasse was played in four leagues, two Saturday leagues and two Sunday leagues. The champions of each group were promoted directly to the 2017–18 Derde Divisie. The 2016–17 Hoofdklasse started on Saturday 13 August 2016.

Play-offs

Promotion
In each competition teams play periods of 10 games for a total of 3 per season (30 games per season). After each period the best team which hasn't qualified yet will earn a spot in the play-offs for the Derde Divisie as the period champion. 6 teams from the Saturday Hoofdklasse will play against 2 teams from the Saturday Derde Divisie for 2 promotion spots. The teams from the Sunday leagues will do the same.

Relegation
The teams in place 13 and 14 at the end of the season will fight against relegation in the relegation play-offs. They will face the period champions of the Eerste Klasse.

Saturday A
Since Haaglandia left the competition after the first round, it was decided to split the competition into 2 periods of 14 matches each and to award the title of the third period to the highest ranked team, besides the champions and winners of both periods, at the end of the season.

Teams

League table

Saturday B

Teams

League table

Sunday A

Teams

League table

Sunday B

Teams

League table

Promotion play-offs

Saturday
The 2 winners of the second round matches will play next season in the Saturday league of the Derde Divisie. The remaining 6 teams will play next season in the Saturday leagues of the Hoofdklasse.

Qualified Teams

Results

* Win after extra time in second leg.
** Promotion to Derde Divisie.
*** Succeeded to remain in the Derde Divisie.

Sunday
The 2 winners of the second round matches will play next season in the Sunday league of the Derde Divisie. The remaining 6 teams will play next season in the Sunday leagues of the Hoofdklasse.

Qualified Teams

Results

* Wins after penalty shoot-out (4-2).
** Promotion to Derde Divisie.

References

External links

2016-17
Neth
4